Courts of Indiana include:
;State courts of Indiana

Indiana Supreme Court
Indiana Court of Appeals (5 districts; previously Indiana Appellate Court)
Indiana Tax Court
Indiana Circuit Courts (91 circuits)Indiana Trial Courts: Types of Courts.
Indiana Superior Courts (177 divisions)
Indiana city and town courts

Federal courts located in Indiana
United States District Court for the Northern District of Indiana
United States District Court for the Southern District of Indiana

Former federal courts of Indiana
United States District Court for the District of Indiana (extinct, subdivided)

References

External links
National Center for State Courts – directory of state court websites.

Courts in the United States